Dasiphora glabrata, with synonyms including Potentilla glabrata, Dasiphora davurica and Potentilla davurica, is a species of flowering plant in the family Rosaceae, native to Siberia (Chita), the far east of Russia (Primorye) and north east China (Manchuria).

References

Potentilleae
Flora of Chita Oblast
Flora of Primorsky Krai
Flora of Manchuria